Kadiri railway station (Station code: KRY) is a station in Anantapur district, Andhra Pradesh, India, serving Kadiri city. It lies on the Dharmavaram–Pakala branch line and comes under the jurisdiction of Guntakal railway division of the South Central Railway zone. The railway line was constructed in 1891 along with the Railway Station and electrified in 2020. The Platforms are well sheltered when compared with other stations in same Railway line. It is the major railway station in the railway line.

References

Railway stations in Anantapur district